Major Allan John Cameron MBE (25 March 1917 – 4 December 2011) was a Scottish soldier and curler. Cameron served in the Queen's Own Cameron Highlanders during the Second World War, rising to the rank of Major. He helped to found the International Curling Federation, the predecessor to the World Curling Federation, and served as its president from 1966–69.

Early life
Born in Achnacarry Castle, near Fort William, Scotland, Allan Cameron was the son of Colonel Sir Donald Walter Cameron of Lochiel, 25th Lochiel of Clan Cameron. He was educated at Harrow School and the Royal Military College, Sandhurst.

Military career
Cameron was commissioned into the British Army in 1936, aged 19, joining the Queen's Own Cameron Highlanders. After commissioning, he served in India, and was the aide-de-camp for a General while stationed in Egypt. Cameron served during the Battle of Gazala in 1942, which ended in the capture of the port city Tobruk by Axis forces and the surrender of thousands of Allied personnel. Along with two other soldiers, he escaped Italian custody in 1943, but was recaptured by German forces six weeks later, eventually being freed after several years by American soldiers. He returned home, and after marrying, was assigned first to Balmoral Castle and then to the Eaton Hall military training school. He retired from military service in 1947.

Political career
For twenty years, Cameron served on the Ross and Cromarty County Council, serving as the chairman of its education committee from 1962–75. He then moved to the Ross and Cromarty District Council and later became its convener. In 1988, he was made an MBE, and on his 79th birthday, in 1996, he became the third recipient of the Freedom of Ross and Cromarty.

Curling career
After beginning to curl in the 1950s, Cameron became the president of the Royal Caledonian Curling Club in 1963, winning the Swedish Cup in 1964. He then helped found the International Curling Federation, serving as its first president from 1965–69.

Personal life 
He is the father of Ewen Cameron, Baron Cameron of Dillington, Christina Cameron, Archibald Cameron and Bride Cameron, who married Lord Donald Graham, son of the 7th Duke of Montrose. His eldest son Allan Douglas Hanning Cameron drowned in 1965.

References

External links
 Allan Cameron at ThePeerage.com

1917 births
2011 deaths
People from Fort William, Highland
Allan
People educated at Harrow School
British Army personnel of World War II
Queen's Own Cameron Highlanders officers
Members of the Order of the British Empire
Scottish male curlers
Councillors in Highland (council area)
Graduates of the Royal Military College, Sandhurst